The 13th Infantry Regiment ("First at Vicksburg") is a United States Army infantry regiment whose battalions are currently tasked as basic training battalions.

History 

During the first post-war expansion of the United States Army following independence, a 13th Regiment of Infantry was formed on 16 July 1798, and was mustered out 11 January 1800.  The second 13th Infantry was constituted 11 January 1812. Following the War of 1812 the 13th Infantry was consolidated on 7 May 1815, with the 4th, 9th, 21st, 40th, and 46th Regiments into a new 5th Infantry Regiment whose lineage continues to the present.

A new, third 13th Infantry Regiment was constituted in May 1861 when the Army expanded the Regular Army during the Civil War. General William Tecumseh Sherman was the colonel of the regiment and Philip Sheridan was one of its captains. It was organized as one of the nine "three-battalion" regiments of regulars, each battalion containing eight companies of infantry, in contrast to the existing ten regular regiments of infantry, which were organized as regiments of a single ten company battalions.

During the American Civil War, the unit earned its motto "First at Vicksburg". It participated in the battles of Hayes Bluffs, Champion Hill, Black River, and on 19 May 1863 took part in the assault at Vicksburg. The 13th Regiment was the only Union unit to plant its colors on the Confederate positions.

Following the Civil War, the army was reorganized by Congress in July 1866, and the 13th was divided into three regiments, each battalion receiving two additional companies and being organized as traditional single battalion regiments of ten companies. The 1st Battalion retained the designation of the 13th Infantry, while the 2nd Battalion became the 22nd Infantry and the 3rd Battalion the 31st Infantry.

From 1867 to 1871 the regiment fought in the Indian Wars in Montana and North Dakota.

In 1897 the 13th US Infantry had been filmed at Fort Jay on Governors Island, New York where they were posted in the years before World War I.

In June 1898 the regiment was sent to Cuba and led the 1st Infantry's attack on San Juan Hill, capturing the Spanish flag.  Major William Auman was the first commanding officer to reach the top of San Juan Hill.

The regiment saw combat in the Philippines during the Philippine–American War, and was assigned to the 8th Infantry Division in June 1918. As a member of this organization, the regiment did not participate in World War I.

In 1939 the regiment was ordered to the Panama Canal Zone and a year later, after having been disbanded, was reconstituted at Camp Jackson, South Carolina. The regiment found itself fighting through the hedgerows of France in July 1944 as a member of the 8th Infantry Division and led the drive to the Aa River. The regiment spent ten months in combat in Normandy, Northern France, The Rhineland and Central Europe. It occupied a position on the Siegfried Line and was involved in the Battle for Brest and the Battle of Hurtgen Forest. Private First Class Walter C. Wetzel was posthumously awarded the Medal of Honor for sacrificing his life to save his comrades.

Following World War II the unit was inactivated at Fort Leonard Wood, Missouri on 18 November 1945. On 17 August 1949 the regiment was activated once again at Fort Jackson, South Carolina as part of the 8th Infantry Division where it remained until 1 August 1954. The 8th Infantry Division was transferred to Fort Carson, Colorado and the 13th went with it where it resumed its training mission. In 1955 the 8th ID was designated an Operation Gyroscope division and as part of the division the 13th completed its last training cycle in December, 1955. In January the regiment began to get permanent party personnel and new recruits, Basic training for these recruits began in mid February and segued immediately into advanced training. Both training blocks were completed by mid June and the regiment achieved "combat ready" status. The regiment under the command of Ellis W. Williamson left Fort Carson for its new assignment in Germany where it replaced the 47th Infantry Regiment, 9th Infantry Division. Regimental headquarters and the 3rd Battalion were stationed at Wiley Barracks in Neu Ulm.

In August 1957 the regiment was reorganised under the Pentomic system as the 1st Battle Group, 13th Infantry Regiment and the old guidons (for A through M companies) were retired and new ones for the 1st Battle Group were issued. In January, 1958 the 1st Battle Group, 13th Infantry Regiment moved from Neu Ulm to Sandhofen. The First Battalion was posted to Baumholder whilst the Second Battalion was posted to Mannheim and remained there until 1 August 1988 when it was inactivated and relieved from assignment to the 8th Infantry Division.

On 27 February 1989, the 13th Infantry Regiment was transferred to the United States Army Training and Doctrine Command and reorganized at Fort Jackson, South Carolina.

Currently, the 1st, 2d, and 3d Battalions of the 13th Infantry Regiment, as part of the 193d Infantry Brigade, conduct Basic Combat Training at Fort Jackson, South Carolina.

Forty Rounds 

The regiment's motto started as a greeting by members of the unit during the American Civil War. A soldier of the 13th Regiment was asked what his Corps badge was. The Union Army XV Corps did not have a badge at this point yet, so the soldier replied by tapping his cartridge box saying "Forty rounds in the cartridge box and twenty in the pocket!". Later, the story came to the attention of General John A. Logan, who ordered a cartridge box with the lettering "40 rounds" to be used in the Corps insigna.

See also
List of United States Regular Army Civil War units

References 

0013
Military units and formations established in 1798
United States Regular Army Civil War units and formations
Military units and formations of the United States in the Indian Wars
1861 establishments in the United States